Ignacio Silva Ureta (July 2, 1837 – March 16, 1924) was a Chilean senator (1894-1915). He was born in Combarbalá and died in Santiago.

External links
 https://www.bcn.cl/historiapolitica/resenas_parlamentarias/wiki/Ignacio_Silva_Ureta

1837 births
1924 deaths
People from Limarí Province
Chilean people of Basque descent
Liberal Democratic Party (Chile, 1893) politicians
Deputies of the Constituent Congress of Chile (1891)
Deputies of the XXIV Legislative Period of the National Congress of Chile
Senators of the XXV Legislative Period of the National Congress of Chile
Senators of the XXVI Legislative Period of the National Congress of Chile
Senators of the XXVII Legislative Period of the National Congress of Chile
Senators of the XXVIII Legislative Period of the National Congress of Chile
Senators of the XXIX Legislative Period of the National Congress of Chile
Senators of the XXX Legislative Period of the National Congress of Chile